

The Polikarpov P-2 was a 1920s Soviet two-seat intermediate training biplane. It was a single-bay biplane powered by a  M-6 water-cooled V-8 engine (Hispano-Suiza 8Fb) with a retractable radiator. The prototype first flew in 1927 and entered production with an order for 55 for use as an intermediate trainer. Problems with the original strut-based wing bracing resulted in many aircraft being modified to use bracing wires. It was one of the first aircraft types to be used to train navigators and machine gunners but the type was not very stable and had problems with flying qualities causing the type to be little used.

Specifications

References

Notes

Bibliography

 

1920s Soviet and Russian military trainer aircraft
P-2